The Roman Ghetto or Ghetto of Rome was a Jewish ghetto established in 1555 in the Rione Sant'Angelo, in Rome, Italy, in the area surrounded by present-day Via del Portico d'Ottavia, Lungotevere dei Cenci, Via del Progresso and Via di Santa Maria del Pianto, close to the River Tiber and the Theatre of Marcellus. With the exception of brief periods under Napoleon from 1808 to 1815 and under the Roman Republics of 1798–99 and 1849, the ghetto of Rome was controlled by the papacy until the capture of Rome in 1870.

Creation

The Jewish community of Rome is probably the oldest in the world outside of the Middle East, with a continuous existence from classical times down to the present day. The first record of Jews in Rome is in 161 BC, when Jason b. Eleazar and Eupolemus b. Johanan are said to have gone there as envoys from Judah Maccabee.

The Roman Ghetto was established as a result of papal bull Cum nimis absurdum, promulgated by Pope Paul IV on 14 July 1555. The bull also required the Jews of Rome, which had existed as a community since before Christian times and which numbered about 2,000 at the time, to live in the ghetto. The ghetto was a walled quarter with its gates locked at night. The wall was built under the direction of the architect Giovanni Sallustio Peruzzi. The cost of the wall's construction, 300 Roman scudi, had to be paid by the Jewish community. The area of Rome chosen for the ghetto was one of the most undesirable quarters of the city, subject to constant flooding by the Tiber River, but where Jews amounted already to 80% of the population. The wall started from Ponte Fabricio reaching the Portico d'Ottavia; from there it run along today's Via del Portico d'Ottavia (not including the ancient fish market; at Piazza Giudea (which was cut in two) it bent again running along Vicolo Cenci (today Via del Progresso) until it reached the Tiber again. The total area amounted to three hectares. At the time of Sixtus V (late 1580s), roughly 3,500 inhabitants were living in inhuman conditions.

The bull also revoked all the rights of the Jewish community and imposed on Jews a variety of new restrictions such as prohibition on property ownership and practising medicine on Christians and compulsory Catholic sermons on the Jewish sabbath.

Jews were not allowed to own any property, even in the ghetto. Christian owners of houses in the ghetto could keep their property but, because of the jus gazzagà (right of possession) they could neither evict the Jews nor raise rents.

Gates were added as the ghetto was successively enlarged. Initially, there were two gates in the wall. The number increased to three in the 16th century and under Sixtus V to five, and finally, during the 19th century to eight. The gates were opened at dawn and closed every night, one hour after sunset between November and Easter, and two hours at other times. The area contained hardly any noteworthy buildings. The only important square — Piazza Giudea — was divided in two parts by the wall. All the churches which stood in the ghetto were deconsecrated and demolished soon after its construction.

In common with many other Italian ghettoes, the ghetto of Rome was not initially so called, but was variously referred to in documents in Italian as serraglio degli Ebrei or claustro degli Ebrei, both meaning "enclosure of the Hebrews". Various forms of the word ghetto came into use in the late 16th century.

Life in the ghetto

Life in the Roman Ghetto was one of crushing poverty, due to the severe restrictions placed upon the occupations that Jews were allowed to perform. Roman Jews were allowed to work only at unskilled jobs, such as ragmen, secondhand dealers or fish mongers. They were permitted to be pawnbrokers (which had been prohibited to Christians); and this activity excited the hatred of many Christians against them.

In the lottery game, they were allowed to bet only on low numbers (from 1 through 30), and all belonging to the same group of 10. In case of a draw of five numbers of that kind, the Romans said that on that day in the ghetto there was taking place a great feast.

When Jews went outside the ghetto, the men had to wear a yellow cloth (the "sciamanno"), and the women a yellow veil (the same color worn by prostitutes). During the feasts they had to amuse the Christians, competing in humiliating games. They had to run naked, with a rope around the neck, or with their legs closed into sacks. Sometimes they were also ridden by soldiers.

Jews had to petition annually for permission to live there. They paid a yearly tax for the privilege. Jews of Rome were required to swear yearly loyalty to the Pope at the Arch of Titus, which celebrates the Roman sack of Jerusalem of 70 CE. Each year, on the Campidoglio, the Rabbi had to pay homage to the chief of the city councillors ("Caporione"), receiving by him in exchange for it a kick to his bottom. This "ceremony" meant that the Jewish community had been allowed to stay one more year in Rome.

Every Saturday, the Jewish community was forced to hear compulsory sermons in front of the small church of San Gregorio a Ponte Quattro Capi, just outside the wall.

At the time of its construction, in the ghetto – as almost everywhere in Rome – there was no fresh water. However, some years later the Popes built several fountains in the rione. One fountain, designed by Giacomo della Porta, was to be placed in the Piazza Giudea, the site of a market, inside the ghetto, but Muzio Mattei used his influence to have the fountain, the Fontana delle Tartarughe (Turtle Fountain), located in the Piazza Mattei, in front of his residence. 

As the Jewish community inside the ghetto grew, there was severe overcrowding. Since the area could not expand horizontally, the Jews built vertical additions to their houses, which blocked the sun from reaching the already dank and narrow streets.

The great number of people living in such a small area, together with the poverty of the population, caused terrible hygienic conditions. The district, lying very low and near the Tiber, was often flooded, and diseases like cholera and malaria were endemic. During the plague of 1656, 800 of the ghetto's 4,000 inhabitants died. In 1867, just three years before the abolition of the ghetto, there was a cholera epidemic. Sant'Angelo, which was the smallest rione by area, also had the highest population density because of the presence of the ghetto.

Abolition

The first great upheaval since Paul IV established the ghetto came during the Napoleonic Wars. Eager to promulgate his own set of universal laws, Napoleon determined that every citizen under his rule would enjoy equal protection under the law. The Napoleonic Code eliminated many, if not all, of the special rights and privileges enjoyed by aristocratic and religious figures; conversely, they also removed the special restrictions and burdens placed on Jewish communities. In many countries, this meant an end to Jewish ghettos. Certainly Rome was no exception: when Napoleon's forces made their triumphant entrance into the city, a special point was made of physically demolishing the old ghetto walls. This was not just a simple act of altruism. Napoleon was determined to show the Catholic Church that he was now the dominant power in Rome. In 1798 he abolished the Papal States and replaced them with a new Roman Republic, which quickly annulled the papal law requiring Jews to reside in the ghetto. To commemorate the event a Tree of Liberty was planted in Piazza delle Cinque Scole ("Piazza of the Five Synagogues"). However, when the Papal States were restored in 1799, the ghetto was reestablished and Jews who had left its confines were compelled to return.

During the 19th century it became clear the ghetto was becoming less and less sustainable. On 17 April 1847, a group of young men from Trastevere broke open the gates of the ghetto after they had been closed for the night. In 1848, at the liberal beginning of his pontificate, Pius IX permitted Jews to live outside the ghetto. Following a brief period of exile, however, during which time Rome was controlled by a second Roman Republic which strongly opposed Church power, the Pope issued a new series of anti-liberal measures, including re-instituting the ghetto. The Jewish head tax was abolished in 1850.

The Papal States ceased to exist on 20 September 1870, when they were combined with the rest of the peninsula into the newly created Kingdom of Italy. With this dramatic change in governments, the requirement that Jews live in the ghetto came to an end. But the centuries of crowds, restrictions, and disease had taken their toll. While the Roman ghetto had once been home to some 10,000 Jews, by 1870 the population was less than half that—and half of those remaining relied on charity to survive. Indeed, the Risorgimento troops who arrived to wrest control of Rome's government away from the Catholic Church were treated as liberators and conquering heroes by many Jewish residents. In 1888, the ghetto walls were torn down, and the ghetto itself was almost completely demolished. In 1904 the Great Synagogue of Rome and a number of apartment buildings were erected on the site. Embankments were created to prevent flooding and reduce the spread of disease.

The Roman Ghetto was the last remaining ghetto in Western Europe until ghettos were reintroduced by Nazi Germany in the 1930s.

Raid

Legacy
Due to the three hundred plus years of isolation from the rest of the city, the Jews of the Roman Ghetto developed their own dialect, known as Giudeo-romanesco, which differs from the dialect of the rest of the city in its preservation of 16th-century dialectical forms and its liberal use of romanized Hebrew words.

Today, the district of the former ghetto is the home of the Great Synagogue of Rome. There is one remaining piece of the ghetto wall, which was built into the wall of one of the courtyards off the Piazza delle Cinque Scole.

See also
Sant'Angelo (rione of Rome)
Jewish ghettos in Europe
History of the Jews in Italy
Samuel di Castelnuovo

Sources

Agresti, Olivia Rossetti (1907). Giovanni Costa, his life, work, and times. 2nd edition London: Gay & Bird. (1st: London: Grant Richards, 1904)
Debenedetti-Stow, Sandra (1992). "The Etymology of 'Ghetto': New Evidence from Rome". Jewish History 6(1/2), The Frank Talmage Memorial Volume: 79–85 
Lerner, L. Scott. (Winter/Spring 2002) "Narrating Over the Ghetto of Rome", Jewish Social Studies 8(2/3) (New Series):1-38. doi 10.1353/jss.2002.0009. 
Stow, Kenneth R. Theater of Acculturation: The Roman Ghetto in the Sixteenth Century (Seattle: University of Washington Press, 2001). 
Stow, Kenneth R. Jewish Life in Early Modern Rome: Challenge, Conversion, and Private Life (Aldershot, 2007).

Notes

References

Further references
  
  Rome: A Let's Go City Guide, Matthew W. Mahan (editor), Macmillan, Cambridge, MA, 2004. , page 104.

Debenedetti-Stow, Sandra (1992). "The Etymology of "Ghetto": New Evidence from Rome". Jewish History 6(1/2), The Frank Talmage Memorial Volume: 79-85

External links

 Google Map: The ghetto lies north of the Isola Tiberina, the white dome of the temple lies between Via Catalana and the river flanking, Lungotevere de' Cenci.
October 18: Jews of Rome Deported to Auschwitz
Liliana Picciotto Fargion. Il Libro della Memoria. Gli Ebrei deportati dall'Italia (1943-1945). Milan: Mursia, 1991 (in Italian)
 Entry in Romeartlover site

Italian Jewish communities
.
Jewish ghettos in Europe
Jewish Italian history
Ghetto
Antisemitism in Italy
Ghetto
1555 establishments in the Papal States
1888 disestablishments in Italy
Ghetto